John M. Goshko (July 29, 1933 – March 23, 2014) was an American journalist for The Washington Post.

Early life
Goshko was born on July 29, 1933, in Lynn, Massachusetts. He graduated from the University of Pennsylvania, where he earned a bachelor's degree in English in 1955. He served in the United States Army for three years and attended the Columbia University Graduate School of Journalism, where he earned a master's degree in 1959.

Career
Goshko began his career in journalism in Minneapolis, Minnesota, where he worked for the Star Tribune. In 1961, he joined The Washington Post. He became their correspondent in Lima, Peru in 1965. By 1967, he was their correspondent in Bolivia. He returned to Washington, D.C. in 1975, and he retired in 2000.

Goshko won the Ed Stout Award for best article or report on Latin America from the Overseas Press Club in 1970. He also won the Maria Moors Cabot Prize the same year.

Personal life and death
Goshko married Linda Levitt. They had four children.

Goshko died on March 23, 2014, in Washington, D.C.

References

1933 births
2014 deaths
People from Lynn, Massachusetts
University of Pennsylvania alumni
Columbia University Graduate School of Journalism alumni
American male journalists
20th-century American journalists
The Washington Post people
Maria Moors Cabot Prize winners